Ankazovelo is a town and commune in Madagascar. It belongs to the district of Midongy-Atsimo, which is a part of Atsimo-Atsinanana Region. There are 1602 inscribed voters in this commune.

Main town is Ankazovelo but the commune also covers the neighboring villages of:

Ambasohihy
Ampasy
Ankazomanga
Bemahala
Mahazoarivo
Nanatotsikora
Telorano
Voanana

References and notes 

Populated places in Atsimo-Atsinanana